Phostria persiusalis is a moth in the family Crambidae. It was described by Francis Walker in 1859. It is found in Brazil and Costa Rica.

References

Phostria
Moths described in 1859
Moths of Central America
Moths of South America